Montes Agricola is an elongated range of mountains near the eastern edge of the central Oceanus Procellarum lunar mare. It lies just to the northwest of a plateau containing the craters Herodotus and Aristarchus.

It continues for a distance of 160 kilometres. This range is a long, slender ridge formation that is more rugged at the northeastern end. There is also a rise at the southwest terminus of the range. The faint trace of a ray parallels the range just to the north. The 20 km gap between this range and the plateau to the south is covered by a flow of basaltic lava. There is a small wrinkle ridge near the northern part that is identified as Dorsum Niggli.

This range is named after Georgius Agricola.

External links
 LTO-38B2 Nielsen — L&PI topographic map of the Montes Agricola and vicinity.
 Montes Agricola in Gazetteer of Planetary Nomenclature
 

Agricola, Montes